Società Sportiva Dilettantistica Women Hellas Verona, known as Hellas Verona or simply Verona, is a women's football club based in Verona, Italy, currently playing in Serie B.

Founded in 1995, the team won the Serie A championship five times and the Coppa Italia three times. They were previously known as A.S.D. Bardolino Verona C.F. between 2007 and 2013.

History
In summer 2011 the club moved from their traditional home in Bardolino to Stadio Olivieri, a small venue in the grounds of Verona's main stadium, Stadio Marc'Antonio Bentegodi.

Current squad

Former players
For details of former players, see :Category:A.S.D. AGSM Verona F.C. players.

Honours 

 Serie A
 Winners (5): 2004–05, 2006–07, 2007–08, 2008–09, 2014–15
 Coppa Italia
 Winners (3): 2005–06, 2006–07, 2008–09

Record in UEFA competitions 
All results (home and away) list Verona's goal tally first.

See also
 List of women's association football clubs
 List of women's football clubs in Italy

References

External links
 Official site
 Club at UEFA.com

Women's football clubs in Italy
Sport in Verona
1995 establishments in Italy
Serie A (women's football) clubs